The Montreal Protocol is an international treaty designed to protect the ozone layer by phasing out the production of numerous substances that are responsible for ozone depletion. It was agreed on 16 September 1987, and entered into force on 1 January 1989. Since then, it has undergone nine revisions, in 1990 (London), 1991 (Nairobi), 1992 (Copenhagen), 1993 (Bangkok), 1995 (Vienna), 1997 (Montreal), 1998 (Australia), 1999 (Beijing) and 2016 (Kigali) As a result of the international agreement, the ozone hole in Antarctica is slowly recovering. Climate projections indicate that the ozone layer will return to 1980 levels between 2040 (across much of the world) and 2066 (over Antarctica). Due to its widespread adoption and implementation, it has been hailed as an example of successful international co-operation. Former UN Secretary-General Kofi Annan stated that "perhaps the single most successful international agreement to date has been the Montreal Protocol". In comparison, effective burden-sharing and solution proposals mitigating regional conflicts of interest have been among the success factors for the ozone depletion challenge, where global regulation based on the Kyoto Protocol has failed to do so. In this case of the ozone depletion challenge, there was global regulation already being installed before a scientific consensus was established. Also, overall public opinion was convinced of possible imminent risks.

The two ozone treaties have been ratified by 198 parties (197 states and the European Union), making them the first universally ratified treaties in United Nations history.

These truly universal treaties have also been remarkable in the expedience of the policy-making process at the global scale, where only 14 years lapsed between a basic scientific research discovery (1973) and the international agreement signed (1985 and 1987).

Terms and purposes 
The treaty is structured around several groups of halogenated hydrocarbons that deplete stratospheric ozone. All of the ozone depleting substances controlled by the Montreal Protocol contain either chlorine or bromine (substances containing only fluorine do not harm the ozone layer). Some ozone-depleting substances (ODSs) are not yet controlled by the Montreal Protocol, including nitrous oxide (N2O) For a table of ozone-depleting substances controlled by the Montreal Protocol see:

For each group of ODSs, the treaty provides a timetable on which the production of those substances must be reduced and eventually eliminated. This includes a 10-year phase-out for developing countries identified in Article 5 of the treaty.

Chlorofluorocarbons (CFCs) Phase-out Management Plan 

The stated purpose of the treaty is that the signatory states

There was a faster phase-out of halon-1211, -2402, -1301, There was a slower phase-out (to zero by 2010) of other substances (halon 1211, 1301, 2402; CFCs 13, 111, 112, etc.) and some chemicals were given individual attention (Carbon tetrachloride; 1,1,1-trichloroethane). The phasing-out of the less damaging HCFCs only began in 1996 and will go on until a complete phasing-out is achieved by 2030.

There were a few exceptions for "essential uses" where no acceptable substitutes were initially found (for example, in the past metered dose inhalers commonly used to treat asthma and chronic obstructive pulmonary disease were exempt) or Halon fire suppression systems used in submarines and aircraft (but not in general industry).

The substances in Group I of Annex A are:

 CFCl3 (CFC-11)
 CF2Cl2 (CFC-12)
 C2F3Cl3 (CFC-113)
 C2F4Cl2(CFC-114)
 C2F5Cl (CFC-115)

The provisions of the Protocol include the requirement that the Parties to the Protocol base their future decisions on the current scientific, environmental, technical, and economic information that is assessed through panels drawn from the worldwide expert communities. To provide that input to the decision-making process, advances in understanding on these topics were assessed in 1989, 1991, 1994, 1998 and 2002 in a series of reports entitled Scientific assessment of ozone depletion, by the Scientific Assessment Panel (SAP).

In 1990 a Technology and Economic Assessment Panel was also established as the technology and economics advisory body to the Montreal Protocol Parties. The Technology and Economic Assessment Panel (TEAP) provides, at the request of Parties, technical information related to the alternative technologies that have been investigated and employed to make it possible to virtually eliminate use of Ozone Depleting Substances (such as CFCs and Halons), that harm the ozone layer. The TEAP is also tasked by the Parties every year to assess and evaluate various technical issues including evaluating nominations for essential use exemptions for CFCs and halons, and nominations for critical use exemptions for methyl bromide. TEAP's annual reports are a basis for the Parties' informed decision-making.

Numerous reports have been published by various inter-governmental, governmental and non-governmental organizations to catalogue and assess alternatives to the ozone depleting substances, since the substances have been used in various technical sectors, like in refrigeration, air conditioning, flexible and rigid foam, fire protection, aerospace, electronics, agriculture, and laboratory measurements.

Hydrochlorofluorocarbons (HCFCs) Phase-out Management Plan (HPMP) 

Under the Montreal Protocol on Substances that Deplete the Ozone Layer, especially Executive Committee (ExCom) 53/37 and ExCom 54/39, Parties to this Protocol agreed to set year 2013 as the time to freeze the consumption and production of HCFCs for developing countries. For developed countries, reduction of HCFC consumption and production began in 2004 and 2010, respectively, with 100% reduction set for 2020.  Developing countries agreed to start reducing its consumption and production of HCFCs by 2015, with 100% reduction set for 2030.

Hydrochlorofluorocarbons, commonly known as HCFCs, are a group of man-made compounds containing hydrogen, chlorine, fluorine and carbon. They are not found anywhere in nature. HCFC production began to take off after countries agreed to phase out the use of CFCs in the 1980s, which were found to be destroying the ozone layer. Like CFCs, HCFCs are used for refrigeration, aerosol propellants, foam manufacture and air conditioning. Unlike the CFCs, however, most HCFCs are broken down in the lowest part of the atmosphere and pose a much smaller risk to the ozone layer. Nevertheless, HCFCs are very potent greenhouse gases, despite their very low atmospheric concentrations, measured in parts per trillion (million million).

The HCFCs are transitional CFCs replacements, used as refrigerants, solvents, blowing agents for plastic foam manufacture, and fire extinguishers. In terms of ozone depletion potential (ODP), in comparison to CFCs that have ODP 0.6 – 1.0, these HCFCs have lower ODPs (0.01 – 0.5). In terms of global warming potential (GWP), in comparison to CFCs that have GWP 4,680 – 10,720, HCFCs have lower GWPs (76 – 2,270).

Hydrofluorocarbons (HFCs) 

On 1 January 2019 the Kigali Amendment to the Montreal Protocol came into force. Under the Kigali Amendment countries promised to reduce the use of hydrofluorocarbons (HFCs) by more than 80% over the next 30 years. By 27 December 2018, 65 countries had ratified the Amendment.

Produced mostly in developed countries, hydrofluorocarbons (HFCs) replaced CFCs and HCFCs. HFCs pose no harm to the ozone layer because, unlike CFCs and HCFCs, they do not contain chlorine. They are, however, greenhouse gases, with a high global warming potential (GWP), comparable to that of CFCs and HCFCs. In 2009, a study calculated that a fast phasedown of high-GWP HFCs could potentially prevent the equivalent of up to 8.8 Gt -eq per year in emissions by 2050. A proposed phasedown of HFCs was hence projected to avoid up to 0.5C of warming by 2100 under the high-HFC growth scenario, and up to 0.35C under the low-HFC growth scenario. Recognizing the opportunity presented for fast and effective phasing down of HFCs through the Montreal Protocol, starting in 2009 the Federated States of Micronesia proposed an amendment to phase down high-GWP HFCs, with the U.S., Canada, and Mexico following with a similar proposal in 2010.

After seven years of negotiations, in October 2016 at the 28th Meeting of the Parties to the Montreal Protocol in Kigali, the Parties to the Montreal Protocol adopted the Kigali Amendment whereby the Parties agreed to phase down HFCs under the Montreal Protocol. The amendment to the legally-binding Montreal Protocol will ensure that industrialised countries bring down their HFC production and consumption by at least 85 per cent compared to their annual average values in the period 2011–2013. A group of developing countries including China, Brazil and South Africa are mandated to reduce their HFC use by 85 per cent of their average value in 2020-22 by the year 2045. India and some other developing countries – Iran, Iraq, Pakistan, and some oil economies like Saudi Arabia and Kuwait – will cut down their HFCs by 85 per cent of their values in 2024-26 by the year 2047.

On 17 November 2017, ahead of the 29th Meeting of the Parties of the Montreal Protocol, Sweden became the 20th Party to ratify the Kigali Amendment, pushing the Amendment over its ratification threshold ensuring that the Amendment would enter into force 1 January 2019.

History

In the 1970s, the chemists Frank Sherwood Rowland and Mario Molina, who were then at the University of California, Irvine, began studying the impacts of CFCs in the Earth's atmosphere. They discovered that CFC molecules were stable enough to remain in the atmosphere until they got up into the middle of the stratosphere where they would finally (after an average of 50–100 years for two common CFCs) be broken down by ultraviolet radiation releasing a chlorine atom. Rowland and Molina then proposed that these chlorine atoms might be expected to cause the breakdown of large amounts of ozone (O3) in the stratosphere. Their argument was based upon an analogy to contemporary work by Paul J. Crutzen and Harold Johnston, which had shown that nitric oxide (NO) could catalyze the destruction of ozone. (Several other scientists, including Ralph Cicerone, Richard Stolarski, Michael McElroy, and Steven Wofsy had independently proposed that chlorine could catalyze ozone loss, but none had realized that CFCs were a potentially large source of chlorine.) Crutzen, Molina and Rowland were awarded the 1995 Nobel Prize for Chemistry for their work on this problem.

The environmental consequence of this discovery was that, since stratospheric ozone absorbs most of the ultraviolet-B (UV-B) radiation reaching the surface of the planet, depletion of the ozone layer by CFCs would lead to an increase in UV-B radiation at the surface, resulting in an increase in skin cancer and other impacts such as damage to crops and to marine phytoplankton.

But the Rowland-Molina hypothesis was strongly disputed by representatives of the aerosol and halocarbon industries. The chair of the board of DuPont was quoted as saying that ozone depletion theory is "a science fiction tale...a load of rubbish...utter nonsense". Robert Abplanalp, the president of Precision Valve Corporation (and inventor of the first practical aerosol spray can valve), wrote to the Chancellor of UC Irvine to complain about Rowland's public statements (Roan, p. 56.)

After publishing their pivotal paper in June 1974, Rowland and Molina testified at a
hearing before the U.S. House of Representatives in December 1974. As a result, significant funding was made available to study various aspects of the problem and to confirm the initial findings. In 1976, the U.S. National Academy of Sciences (NAS) released a report that confirmed the scientific credibility of the ozone depletion hypothesis. NAS continued to publish assessments of related science for the next decade.

Then, in 1985, British Antarctic Survey scientists Joe Farman, Brian Gardiner and Jon Shanklin published results of abnormally low ozone concentrations above Halley Bay near the South Pole. They speculated that this was connected to increased levels of CFCs in the atmosphere. It took several other attempts to establish the Antarctic losses as real and significant, especially after NASA had retrieved matching data from its satellite recordings. This unforeseen phenomenon in the Antarctic, as well as NASA's scientific images of the ozone hole played an important role in the Montreal Protocol negotiations. The impact of these studies, the metaphor 'ozone hole', and the colourful visual representation in a time lapse animation proved shocking enough for negotiators in Montreal, Canada to take the issue seriously.

Also in 1985, 20 nations, including most of the major CFC producers, signed the Vienna Convention, which established a framework for negotiating international regulations on ozone-depleting substances. After the discovery of the ozone hole 
by SAGE 2 it only took 18 months to reach a binding agreement in Montreal, Canada.

But the CFC industry did not give up that easily. As late as 1986, the Alliance for Responsible CFC Policy (an association representing the CFC industry founded by DuPont) was still arguing that the science was too uncertain to justify any action. In 1987, DuPont testified before the US Congress that "We believe there is no imminent crisis that demands unilateral regulation." And even in March 1988, Du Pont Chair Richard E. Heckert would write in a letter to the United States Senate, "we will not produce a product unless it can be made, used, handled and disposed of safely and consistent with appropriate safety, health and environmental quality criteria. At the moment, scientific evidence does not point to the need for dramatic CFC emission reductions. There is no available measure of the contribution of CFCs to any observed ozone change..."

Multilateral Fund

The main objective of the Multilateral Fund for the Implementation of the Montreal Protocol is to assist developing country parties to the Montreal Protocol whose annual per capita consumption and production of ozone depleting substances (ODS) is less than 0.3 kg to comply with the control measures of the Protocol. Currently, 147 of the 196 Parties to the Montreal Protocol meet these criteria (they are referred to as Article 5 countries).

It embodies the principle agreed at the United Nations Conference on Environment and Development in 1992 that countries have a common but differentiated responsibility to protect and manage the global commons.

The Fund is managed by an executive committee with an equal representation of seven industrialized and seven Article 5 countries, which are elected annually by a Meeting of the Parties. The Committee reports annually to the Meeting of the Parties on its operations. The work of the Multilateral Fund on the ground in developing countries is carried out by four Implementing Agencies, which have contractual agreements with the executive committee:

 United Nations Environment Programme (UNEP), through its OzonAction Programme.
 United Nations Development Programme (UNDP).
 United Nations Industrial Development Organization (UNIDO).
 World Bank.

Up to 20 percent of the contributions of contributing parties can also be delivered through their bilateral agencies in the form of eligible projects and activities.

The fund is replenished on a three-year basis by the donors. Pledges amount to US$3.1 billion over the period 1991 to 2005. Funds are used, for example, to finance the conversion of existing manufacturing processes, train personnel, pay royalties and patent rights on new technologies, and establish national ozone offices.

Parties 
As of October 2022, all Member States of the United Nations, the Cook Islands, Niue, the Holy See, the State of Palestine as well as the European Union have ratified the original Montreal Protocol (see external link below), with the State of Palestine being the last party to ratify the agreement, bringing the total to 198. 197 of those parties (with the exception of the State of Palestine) have also ratified the London, Copenhagen, Montreal, and Beijing amendments.

Effect 

Since the Montreal Protocol came into effect, the atmospheric concentrations of the most important chlorofluorocarbons and related chlorinated hydrocarbons have either leveled off or decreased. Halon concentrations have continued to increase, as the halons presently stored in fire extinguishers are released, but their rate of increase has slowed and their abundances are expected to begin to decline by about 2020. Also, the concentration of the HCFCs increased drastically at least partly because of many uses (e.g. used as solvents or refrigerating agents) CFCs were substituted with HCFCs. While there have been reports of attempts by individuals to circumvent the ban, e.g. by smuggling CFCs from undeveloped to developed nations, the overall level of compliance has been high. Statistical analysis from 2010 show a clear positive signal from the Montreal Protocol to the stratospheric ozone. In consequence, the Montreal Protocol has often been called the most successful international environmental agreement to date. In a 2001 report, NASA found the ozone thinning over Antarctica had remained the same thickness for the previous three years, however in 2003 the ozone hole grew to its second largest size. The most recent (2006) scientific evaluation of the effects of the Montreal Protocol states, "The Montreal Protocol is working: There is clear evidence of a decrease in the atmospheric burden of ozone-depleting substances and some early signs of stratospheric ozone recovery." However, a more recent study seems to point to a relative increase in CFCs due to an unknown source.

Reported in 1997, significant production of CFCs occurred in Russia for sale on the black market to the EU throughout the 90s. Related US production and consumption was enabled by fraudulent reporting due to poor enforcement mechanisms. Similar illegal markets for CFCs were detected in Taiwan, Korea, and Hong Kong.

The Montreal Protocol is also expected to have effects on human health. A 2015 report by the U. S. Environmental Protection Agency estimates that the protection of the ozone layer under the treaty will prevent over 280 million cases of skin cancer, 1.5 million skin cancer deaths, and 45 million cataracts in the United States.

However, the hydrochlorofluorocarbons, or HCFCs, and hydrofluorocarbons, or HFCs, are now thought to contribute to anthropogenic global warming. On a molecule-for-molecule basis, these compounds are up to 10,000 times more potent greenhouse gases than carbon dioxide. The Montreal Protocol currently calls for a complete phase-out of HCFCs by 2030, but does not place any restriction on HFCs. Since the CFCs themselves are equally powerful greenhouse gases, the mere substitution of HFCs for CFCs does not significantly increase the rate of anthropogenic climate change, but over time a steady increase in their use could increase the danger that human activity will change the climate.

Policy experts have advocated for increased efforts to link ozone protection efforts to climate protection efforts. Policy decisions in one arena affect the costs and effectiveness of environmental improvements in the other.

Regional detections of non-compliance 

In 2018, scientists monitoring the atmosphere following the 2010 phaseout date have reported evidence of continuing industrial production of CFC-11, likely in eastern Asia, with detrimental global effects on the ozone layer. A monitoring study detected fresh atmospheric releases of carbon tetrachloride from China's Shandong province, beginning sometime after 2012, and accounting for a large part of emissions exceeding global estimates under the Montreal Protocol.

25th anniversary celebrations 
The year 2012 marked the 25th anniversary of the signing of the Montreal Protocol. Accordingly, the Montreal Protocol community organized a range of celebrations at the national, regional and international levels to publicize its considerable success to date and to consider the work ahead for the future.
Among its accomplishments are: The Montreal Protocol was the first international treaty to address a global environmental regulatory challenge; the first to embrace the "precautionary principle" in its design for science-based policymaking; the first treaty where independent experts on atmospheric science, environmental impacts, chemical technology, and economics, reported directly to Parties, without edit or censorship, functioning under norms of professionalism, peer review, and respect; the first to provide for national differences in responsibility and financial capacity to respond by establishing a multilateral fund for technology transfer; the first MEA with stringent reporting, trade, and binding chemical phase-out obligations for both developed and developing countries; and, the first treaty with a financial mechanism managed democratically by an executive board with equal representation by developed and developing countries.

Within 25 years of signing, parties to the MP celebrate significant milestones. Significantly, the world has phased-out 98% of the Ozone-Depleting Substances (ODS) contained in nearly 100 hazardous chemicals worldwide; every country is in compliance with stringent obligations; and, the MP has achieved the status of the first global regime with universal ratification; even the newest member state, South Sudan, ratified in 2013. UNEP received accolades for achieving global consensus that "demonstrates the world’s commitment to ozone protection, and more broadly, to global environmental protection".

See also 

 Action for Climate Empowerment
 Carbon footprint
 Copenhagen Accord
 Net capacity factor
 International Day for the Preservation of the Ozone Layer
 Paris Agreement
 R-134a
 Section 608
 Vienna Conference (1985)

Notes

References

(referred to as Ozone Layer Protection)

Further reading
 Andersen, S. O. and K. M. Sarma. (2002). Protecting the Ozone Layer: the United Nations History, Earthscan Press. London.
 Andersen, S. O., K. M. Sarma and K. N. Taddonio. (2007). Technology Transfer for the Ozone Layer: Lessons for Climate Change. Earthscan Press, London.
 Benedick, Richard E. (1991). Ozone Diplomacy. Harvard University Press.  (Ambassador Benedick was the Chief U.S. Negotiator at the meetings that resulted in the Protocol.)
 Brodeur, Paul (1986). "Annals of Chemistry: In the Face of Doubt." The New Yorker, 9 June 1986, pp. 70–87.
 Chasek, Pam, David Downie, and J.W. Brown (2013 – forthcoming). Global Environmental Politics, 6th Edition, Boulder: Westview Press.
 Dotto, Lydia and Harold Schiff (1978). The Ozone War. New York: Doubleday (publisher).
 Downie, David (1993). "Comparative Public Policy of Ozone Layer Protection." Political Science (NZ) 45(2): (December): 186–197.
 Downie, David (1995). "Road Map or False Trail: Evaluating the Precedence of the Ozone Regime as Model and Strategy for Global Climate Change," International Environmental Affairs, 7(4):321–345 (Fall 1995).
 Downie, David (1999). "The Power to Destroy: Understanding Stratospheric Ozone Politics as a Common Pool Resource Problem", in J. Barkin and G. Shambaugh (eds.) Anarchy and the Environment: The International Relations of Common Pool Resources. Albany: State University of New York Press.
 David L. Downie (2012). "The Vienna Convention, Montreal Protocol and Global Policy to Protect Stratospheric Ozone", in P. Wexler et al. (eds.) Chemicals, Environment, Health: A Global Management Perspective. Oxford: Taylor & Francis.
 Downie, David (2013) "Stratospheric Ozone Depletion." The Routledge Handbook of Global Environmental Politics. New York: Routledge.
 Farman, J.C., B.G. Gardiner, and J.D. Shanklin (1985). "Large Losses of Total Ozone in Antarctica Reveal Seasonal / Interaction." Nature 315: 207–210, 16 May 1985.
 Gareau, Brian J. (2013). From Precaution to Profit: Contemporary Challenges to Environmental Protection in the Montreal Protocol. New Haven & London: Yale University Press. 
 Grundmann, Reiner. (2001). Transnational Environmental Policy: Reconstructing Ozone, London: Routledge. 
 Litfin, Karen T. (1994). Ozone Discourses. Columbia University Press. 
 Molina, Mario and F. Sherwood Rowland (1974). "Stratospheric Sink for Chlorofluoromethanes: Chlorine Atomic Catalyzed Destruction of Ozone." Nature 249: 810–12, 28 June 1974.
 Morissette, P.M. (1989). "The evolution of policy responses to stratospheric ozone depletion." Natural Resources Journal 29: 793–820.
 Parson, Edward (2003). Protecting the Ozone Layer: Science and Strategy. Oxford: Oxford University Press.
 Roan, Sharon (1989). Ozone Crisis: The 15-Year Evolution of a Sudden Global Emergency. New York, John Wiley and Sons
 United Nations Environmental Programme. (2012). The Montreal Protocol and The Green Economy.
 Velders, G. J. M., S. O. Andersen, J. S. Daniel, D. W. Fahey, and M. McFarland. (2007). The Importance of the Montreal Protocol in Protecting the Climate. Proc. of the Natl. Acad. Of Sci., 104(12), 4814–4819, doi:10.1073/pnas.0610328104.
 Velders, G. J. M., D. W. Fahey, J. S Daniel, M. McFarland, and S. O. Andersen. (2009). The Large Contribution of Projected HFC Emissions to Future Climate Forcing. Proc. of the Natl. Acad. Of Sci., 106(27), doi:10.1073/pnas.090281716.
 Velders, G. J. M., A. R. Ravishankara, M. K. Miller, M. J. Molina, J. Alcamo, J. S. Daniel, D. W. Fahey, S. A. Montzka, and S. Reimann. (2012). Preserving Montreal Protocol Climate Benefits by Limiting HFCs. Science, 335(6071), 922–923, doi:10.1126/science.1216414.

External links 
Multilateral Fund for the Implementation of the Montreal Protocol
The Montreal Protocol
The Vienna Convention
Ozone-Depleting Substances (ODS) Controlled Under the Montreal Protocol
U.S. EPA Ozone Layer Protection Information Home Page
The Montreal Protocol Who's Who 
 by F.Sherwood Rowland and Mario J.Molina
Has the Montreal Protocol been successful in reducing ozone-depleting gases in the atmosphere? (NOAA Aeronomy Lab)
Doomsday Déjà vu: Ozone Depletion's Lessons for Global Warming  by Ben Lieberman
EIA reports: Reports on illegal trade and solutions.
 Introductory note by Edith Brown Weiss, procedural history note and audiovisual material on the Montreal Protocol on Substances that Deplete the Ozone Layer in the Historic Archives of the United Nations Audiovisual Library of International Law
 Green Cooling Initiative
 Green Cooling Initiative on alternative natural refrigerants cooling technologies

Environmental treaties
Ozone depletion
1987 in Canada
History of Montreal
Treaties concluded in 1987
Treaties entered into force in 1989
1989 in the environment
Treaties of the Afghan Transitional Administration
Treaties of Albania
Treaties of Algeria
Treaties of Andorra
Treaties of Angola
Treaties of Antigua and Barbuda
Treaties of Argentina
Treaties of Armenia
Treaties of Australia
Treaties of Austria
Treaties of Azerbaijan
Treaties of the Bahamas
Treaties of Bahrain
Treaties of Bangladesh
Treaties of Barbados
Treaties of the Byelorussian Soviet Socialist Republic
Treaties of Belgium
Treaties of Belize
Treaties of Benin
Treaties of Bhutan
Treaties of Bolivia
Treaties of Bosnia and Herzegovina
Treaties of Botswana
Treaties of Brazil
Treaties of Brunei
Treaties of Bulgaria
Treaties of Burkina Faso
Treaties of Burundi
Treaties of Cambodia
Treaties of Cameroon
Treaties of Canada
Treaties of Cape Verde
Treaties of the Central African Republic
Treaties of Chad
Treaties of Chile
Treaties of the People's Republic of China
Treaties of Colombia
Treaties of the Comoros
Treaties of the Republic of the Congo
Treaties of the Cook Islands
Treaties of Costa Rica
Treaties of Ivory Coast
Treaties of Croatia
Treaties of Cuba
Treaties of Cyprus
Treaties of the Czech Republic
Treaties of Czechoslovakia
Treaties of North Korea
Treaties of Zaire
Treaties of Denmark
Treaties of Djibouti
Treaties of Dominica
Treaties of the Dominican Republic
Treaties of Ecuador
Treaties of Egypt
Treaties of El Salvador
Treaties of Equatorial Guinea
Treaties of Eritrea
Treaties of Estonia
Treaties of the Transitional Government of Ethiopia
Treaties of Fiji
Treaties of Finland
Treaties of France
Treaties of Gabon
Treaties of the Gambia
Treaties of Georgia (country)
Treaties of West Germany
Treaties of East Germany
Treaties of Ghana
Treaties of Greece
Treaties of Grenada
Treaties of Guatemala
Treaties of Guinea
Treaties of Guinea-Bissau
Treaties of Guyana
Treaties of Haiti
Treaties of Honduras
Treaties of Hungary
Treaties of Iceland
Treaties of India
Treaties of Indonesia
Treaties of Iran
Treaties of Iraq
Treaties of Ireland
Treaties of Israel
Treaties of Italy
Treaties of Jamaica
Treaties of Japan
Treaties of Jordan
Treaties of Kazakhstan
Treaties of Kenya
Treaties of Kiribati
Treaties of Kuwait
Treaties of Kyrgyzstan
Treaties of Laos
Treaties of Latvia
Treaties of Lebanon
Treaties of Lesotho
Treaties of Liberia
Treaties of the Libyan Arab Jamahiriya
Treaties of Liechtenstein
Treaties of Lithuania
Treaties of Luxembourg
Treaties of Madagascar
Treaties of Malawi
Treaties of Malaysia
Treaties of the Maldives
Treaties of Mali
Treaties of Malta
Treaties of the Marshall Islands
Treaties of Mauritania
Treaties of Mauritius
Treaties of Mexico
Treaties of the Federated States of Micronesia
Treaties of Monaco
Treaties of Mongolia
Treaties of Montenegro
Treaties of Morocco
Treaties of Mozambique
Treaties of Myanmar
Treaties of Namibia
Treaties of Nauru
Treaties of Nepal
Treaties of the Netherlands
Treaties of New Zealand
Treaties of Nicaragua
Treaties of Niger
Treaties of Nigeria
Treaties of Niue
Treaties of Norway
Treaties of Oman
Treaties of Pakistan
Treaties of Palau
Treaties of Panama
Treaties of Papua New Guinea
Treaties of Paraguay
Treaties of Peru
Treaties of the Philippines
Treaties of Poland
Treaties of Portugal
Treaties of Qatar
Treaties of South Korea
Treaties of Moldova
Treaties of Romania
Treaties of the Soviet Union
Treaties of Rwanda
Treaties of Samoa
Treaties of San Marino
Treaties of São Tomé and Príncipe
Treaties of Saudi Arabia
Treaties of Senegal
Treaties of Serbia and Montenegro
Treaties of Seychelles
Treaties of Sierra Leone
Treaties of Singapore
Treaties of Slovakia
Treaties of Slovenia
Treaties of the Solomon Islands
Treaties of the Transitional National Government of Somalia
Treaties of South Africa
Treaties of South Sudan
Treaties of Spain
Treaties of Sri Lanka
Treaties of Saint Kitts and Nevis
Treaties of Saint Lucia
Treaties of Saint Vincent and the Grenadines
Treaties of the Republic of the Sudan (1985–2011)
Treaties of Suriname
Treaties of Eswatini
Treaties of Sweden
Treaties of Switzerland
Treaties of Syria
Treaties of Tajikistan
Treaties of Thailand
Treaties of North Macedonia
Treaties of East Timor
Treaties of Togo
Treaties of Tonga
Treaties of Trinidad and Tobago
Treaties of Tunisia
Treaties of Turkey
Treaties of Turkmenistan
Treaties of Tuvalu
Treaties of Uganda
Treaties of the Ukrainian Soviet Socialist Republic
Treaties of the United Arab Emirates
Treaties of the United Kingdom
Treaties of Tanzania
Treaties of the United States
Treaties of Uruguay
Treaties of Uzbekistan
Treaties of Vanuatu
Treaties of Venezuela
Treaties of Vietnam
Treaties of Yemen
Treaties of Yugoslavia
Treaties of Zambia
Treaties of Zimbabwe
Treaties of the Holy See
Treaties entered into by the European Union
United Nations treaties
Treaties extended to the Faroe Islands
Treaties extended to Greenland
Treaties extended to the Netherlands Antilles
Treaties extended to Aruba
Treaties extended to Jersey
Treaties extended to the Isle of Man
Treaties extended to Anguilla
Treaties extended to Bermuda
Treaties extended to the British Antarctic Territory
Treaties extended to the British Indian Ocean Territory
Treaties extended to the British Virgin Islands
Treaties extended to the Cayman Islands
Treaties extended to the Falkland Islands
Treaties extended to Gibraltar
Treaties extended to Montserrat
Treaties extended to the Pitcairn Islands
Treaties extended to Saint Helena, Ascension and Tristan da Cunha
Treaties extended to South Georgia and the South Sandwich Islands
Treaties extended to the Turks and Caicos Islands
Treaties extended to Guernsey
Treaties extended to Tokelau
Treaties extended to British Hong Kong
Treaties extended to Portuguese Macau
Articles containing video clips
Technological phase-outs